Minuscule 846 (in the Gregory-Aland numbering), Νλ29 (von Soden), is a 14th-century Greek minuscule manuscript of the New Testament on parchment. The manuscript has no complex content.

Description 

The codex contains the text of the Gospel of Luke (6:32-12:17) on 343 parchment leaves (size ), with a catena. The text is written in one column per page, 31 lines per page.

Text 
The Greek text of the codex is a representative of the Byzantine text-type. Kurt Aland the Greek text of the codex placed in Category V.
It was not examined by the Claremont Profile Method.

History 

C. R. Gregory dated the manuscript to the 14th century. Currently the manuscript is dated by the INTF to the 14th century.

The manuscript was added to the list of New Testament manuscripts by Gregory (846e). Gregory saw it in 1886.

Currently the manuscript is housed at the Biblioteca Angelica (Ms. 100), in Rome.

See also 

 List of New Testament minuscules
 Biblical manuscript
 Textual criticism
 Minuscule 847
 Minuscule 853 – similar manuscript

References

Further reading

External links 
 

Greek New Testament minuscules
14th-century biblical manuscripts